Austrian German, Austrian Standard German (ASG), Standard Austrian German, or Austrian High German, is the variety of Standard German written and spoken in Austria. It has the highest sociolinguistic prestige locally, as it is the variation used in the media and for other formal situations. In less formal situations, Austrians use Bavarian and Alemannic dialects, which are traditionally spoken but rarely written in Austria.

History
Austrian German has its beginning in the mid-18th century, when Empress Maria Theresa and her son Joseph II introduced compulsory schooling in 1774, and several reforms of administration in their multilingual Habsburg Empire. At the time, the written standard was Oberdeutsche Schreibsprache (Upper German written language), which was highly influenced by the Bavarian and Alemannic dialects of Austria. Another option was to create a new standard based on the Southern German dialects, as proposed by the linguist Johann Siegmund Popowitsch. Instead they decided for pragmatic reasons to adopt the already-standardized chancellery language of Saxony (Sächsische Kanzleisprache or Meißner Kanzleideutsch), which was based on the administrative language of the non-Austrian area of Meißen and Dresden.
Austria High German (Hochdeutsch in Österreich, not to be confused with the Bavarian Austria German dialects) has the same geographic origin as the Swiss High German (Schweizer Hochdeutsch, not to be confused with the Alemannic Swiss German dialects).

The process of introducing the new written standard was led by Joseph von Sonnenfels.

Since 1951, the standardized form of Austrian German for official texts and schools has been defined by the Österreichisches Wörterbuch ("Austrian Dictionary"), published under the authority of the Austrian Federal Ministry of Education, Arts and Culture.

Standard Austrian German
The official Austrian dictionary, Österreichisches Wörterbuch, prescribes grammatical and spelling rules that define the official language.

Austrian delegates participated in the international working group that drafted the German spelling reform of 1996 and several conferences leading up to the reform were hosted in Vienna at the invitation of the Austrian federal government. Austria adopted it as a signatory, along with Germany, Switzerland, and Liechtenstein, of an international memorandum of understanding signed in Vienna in 1996.

The eszett or "sharp s" (ß) is used in Austria, as in Germany but unlike in Switzerland.

Because of German's pluricentric nature, German dialects in Austria should not be confused with the variety of Standard Austrian German spoken by most Austrians, which is distinct from that of Germany or Switzerland.

Distinctions in vocabulary persist, for example, in culinary terms, for which communication with Germans is frequently difficult, and administrative and legal language  because of Austria's exclusion from the development of a German nation-state in the late 19th century and its manifold particular traditions. A comprehensive collection of Austrian-German legal, administrative and economic terms is offered in Markhardt, Heidemarie: Wörterbuch der österreichischen Rechts-, Wirtschafts- und Verwaltungsterminologie (Peter Lang, 2006).

Former spoken standard
The sociolect, a variety of Standard German, is influenced by Viennese German and other Austro-Bavarian dialects spoken in eastern Austria but is slightly nasalized.

Special written forms
It is a very traditional form of the language, probably derived from medieval deeds and documents, and has a very complex structure and vocabulary generally reserved for such documents. For most speakers (even native speakers), this form of the language is generally difficult to understand, as it contains many highly-specialised terms for diplomatic, internal, official, and military matters. There are no regional variations because the special written form has been used mainly by a government that has now for centuries been based in Vienna.

 is now used less and less because of various administrative reforms that reduced the number of traditional civil servants. As a result, Standard Austrian German is replacing it in government and administrative texts.

European Union
When Austria became a member of the European Union, 23 food-related terms were listed in its accession agreement as having the same legal status as the equivalent terms used in Germany, 
for example, the words for "potato", "tomato", and "Brussels sprouts". (Examples in "Vocabulary")
Austrian German is the only variety of a pluricentric language recognized under international law or EU primary law.

Grammar

Verbs
In Austria, as in the German-speaking parts of Switzerland and in southern Germany, verbs that express a state tend to use  as the auxiliary verb in the perfect, as well as verbs of movement. Verbs which fall into this category include sitzen (to sit), liegen (to lie) and, in parts of Carinthia, schlafen (to sleep). Therefore, the perfect of these verbs would be ich bin gesessen, ich bin gelegen and ich bin geschlafen, respectively.

In Germany, the words stehen (to stand) and gestehen (to confess) are identical in the present perfect: habe gestanden. The Austrian variant avoids that potential ambiguity (bin gestanden from stehen, "to stand"; and habe gestanden from gestehen, "to confess": "der Verbrecher ist vor dem Richter gestanden und hat gestanden").

In addition, the preterite (simple past) is very rarely used in Austria, especially in the spoken language, with the exception of some modal verbs (ich sollte, ich wollte).

Vocabulary
There are many official terms that differ in Austrian German from their usage in most parts of Germany. Words used in Austria are Jänner (January) rather than Januar, Feber (seldom, February) along with Februar, heuer (this year) along with dieses Jahr, Stiege (stairs) along with Treppen, Rauchfang (chimney) instead of Schornstein, many administrative, legal and political terms, and many food terms, including the following:

There are, however, some false friends between the two regional varieties:
Kasten (wardrobe) along with or instead of Schrank (and, similarly, Eiskasten along with Kühlschrank, fridge), as opposed to Kiste (box) instead of Kasten. Kiste in Germany means both "box" and "chest".
Sessel (chair) instead of Stuhl. Sessel means "" in Germany and Stuhl means "stool (faeces)" in both varieties.

Dialects

Classification
Dialects of the Austro-Bavarian group, which also comprises dialects from Bavaria
Central Austro-Bavarian (along the main rivers Isar and Danube, spoken in the northern parts of the State of Salzburg, Upper Austria, Lower Austria, and northern Burgenland)
Viennese German
Southern Austro-Bavarian (in Tyrol, South Tyrol, Carinthia, Styria, and the southern parts of Salzburg and Burgenland)
Vorarlbergerisch, spoken in Vorarlberg, is a High Alemannic dialect.

Regional accents
In addition to the standard variety, in everyday life most Austrians speak one of a number of Upper German dialects.

While strong forms of the various dialects are not fully mutually intelligible to northern Germans, communication is much easier in Bavaria, especially rural areas, where the Bavarian dialect still predominates as the mother tongue. The Central Austro-Bavarian dialects are more intelligible to speakers of Standard German than the Southern Austro-Bavarian dialects of Tyrol.

Viennese, the Austro-Bavarian dialect of Vienna, is seen for many in Germany as quintessentially Austrian. The people of Graz, the capital of Styria, speak yet another dialect which is not very Styrian and more easily understood by people from other parts of Austria than other Styrian dialects, for example from western Styria.

Simple words in the various dialects are very similar, but pronunciation is distinct for each and, after listening to a few spoken words, it may be possible for an Austrian to realise which dialect is being spoken. However, in regard to the dialects of the deeper valleys of the Tyrol, other Tyroleans are often unable to understand them. Speakers from the different states of Austria can easily be distinguished from each other by their particular accents (probably more so than Bavarians), those of Carinthia, Styria, Vienna, Upper Austria, and the Tyrol being very characteristic. Speakers from those regions, even those speaking Standard German, can usually be easily identified by their accent, even by an untrained listener.

Several of the dialects have been influenced by contact with non-Germanic linguistic groups, such as the dialect of Carinthia, where, in the past, many speakers were bilingual (and, in the southeastern portions of the state, many still are even today) with Slovene, and the dialect of Vienna, which has been influenced by immigration during the Austro-Hungarian period, particularly from what is today the Czech Republic. The German dialects of South Tyrol have been influenced by local Romance languages, particularly noticeable with the many loanwords from Italian and Ladin.

The geographic borderlines between the different accents (isoglosses) coincide strongly with the borders of the states and also with the border with Bavaria, with Bavarians having a markedly different rhythm of speech in spite of the linguistic similarities.

References

Notes

Citations

Works cited

Further reading
 : Die deutsche Sprache in Deutschland, Österreich und der Schweiz: Das Problem der nationalen Varietäten. de Gruyter, Berlin/New York 1995.
 Ammon, Ulrich / Hans Bickel, Jakob Ebner u. a.: Variantenwörterbuch des Deutschen. Die Standardsprache in Österreich, der Schweiz und Deutschland sowie in Liechtenstein, Luxemburg, Ostbelgien und Südtirol. Berlin/New York 2004, .
 Dollinger, Stefan: Österreichisches Deutsch oder Deutsch in Österreich? Identitäten im 21. Jahrhundert. New Academic Press, 2021. Available online, 3rd ed.:https://www.nid-library.com/Home/BookDetail/512 
 Grzega, Joachim: „Deutschländisch und Österreichisches Deutsch: Mehr Unterschiede als nur in Wortschatz und Aussprache.“ In: Joachim Grzega: Sprachwissenschaft ohne Fachchinesisch. Shaker, Aachen 2001, S. 7–26. .
 Grzega, Joachim: "On the Description of National Varieties: Examples from (German and Austrian) German and (English and American) English". In: Linguistik Online 7 (2000).
 Grzega, Joachim: "Nonchalance als Merkmal des Österreichischen Deutsch". In: Muttersprache 113 (2003): 242–254.
 Muhr, Rudolf / Schrodt, Richard: Österreichisches Deutsch und andere nationale Varietäten plurizentrischer Sprachen in Europa. Wien, 1997
 
 Muhr, Rudolf/Schrodt, Richard/Wiesinger, Peter (eds.): Österreichisches Deutsch: Linguistische, sozialpsychologische und sprachpolitische Aspekte einer nationalen Variante des Deutschen. Wien, 1995.
 Pohl, Heinz Dieter: „Österreichische Identität und österreichisches Deutsch“ aus dem „Kärntner Jahrbuch für Politik 1999“ Wiesinger, Peter: Die deutsche Sprache in Österreich. Eine Einführung, In: Wiesinger (Hg.): Das österreichische Deutsch. Schriften zur deutschen Sprache. Band 12.'' (Wien, Köln, Graz, 1988, Verlag, Böhlau)

External links
Austrian German – German Dictionary
Das Österreichische Volkswörterbuch

Bavarian language
German dialects
German
National varieties of German